Harry Rhett Townes (September 18, 1914 – May 23, 2001) was an American actor who later became an Episcopalian minister.

Early life
Harry Townes was born in Huntsville, Alabama. the son of Mr. and Mrs. Charles Townes. He had a brother and a sister. He graduated from Huntsville High School, and while attending the University of Alabama in Tuscaloosa, Townes began landing acting roles. Upon graduation, he moved to New York City to study acting at Columbia University.

Career
Townes performed in several New York and Broadway stage productions, including summer stock. His Broadway credits include In the Matter of J. Robert Oppenheimer (1968), Gramercy Ghost (1950), Twelfth Night (1949), Mr. Sycamore (1942), and Tobacco Road (1942).

During World War II, he served three years in the United States Army. Discharged in 1946, he enrolled at Columbia University to study drama.

As a character actor, Townes was a familiar face to television viewers in the 1950s and 1960s.  His expanded range led him to fill a variety of roles, and he avoided being typecast. He made five guest appearances on Perry Mason, including the role of title character Newton Bain in the 1964 episode, "The Case of the Woeful Widower." He also made three appearances on Bonanza and seven on Gunsmoke and in The Fugitive. He made single and double appearances on numerous other television series, including in Star Trek: The Original Series. Besides appearing in 29 films, he is credited with more than 200 television roles. He gained a cult following with a younger audience for a guest shot on "The First", a two-part episode of The Incredible Hulk, in which he portrays Dell Frye, a man with the ability to transform as well into a Hulk-like creature. "The First" is one of the more popular episodes from the television series largely because of Townes' performance

Later years and death
While he was acting, Townes took philosophy classes at UCLA and studied for the ministry at Bishop Bloy School of Theology in Los Angeles. His ordination as a deacon came in 1973 at St. Paul's Cathedral in Los Angeles. He was ordained as an Episcopal minister in St. Paul's Cathedral on March 16, 1974. He served at St. Mary of the Angels Church in Hollywood. He retired from acting in 1989 and returned to his hometown of Huntsville, where he lived the remainder of his life.

On May 23, 2001, Townes died at his home in Huntsville at the age of 86, and his body was interred at Maple Hill Cemetery, also in Huntsville.

Selected filmography 

Westinghouse Studio One (1952, TV Series)
The Web (1953-1954, TV Series)
Operation Manhunt (1954) - Igor Gouzenko
Justice (1954, TV Series)
The Mountain (1956) - Joseph
Alfred Hitchcock Presents (1956-1957, TV Series) - Richard Ross / Ed
Father Knows Best - episode "Class Prophecy" (1957, TV Series) - Henry Pruett
Have Gun Will Travel (1958, TV Series) - Henry Prince
The Brothers Karamazov (1958) - Ippoli Kirillov
Screaming Mimi (1958) - Dr. Greenwood / Bill Green
Cry Tough (1959) - Carlos Mendoza Lewis
The Twilight Zone (1959, TV Series) - Arch Hammer
The Troubleshooters  (1959, TV Series) - Verne Lewis
Men Into Space (1959, TV Series) - Dr. William Thyssen
Destination Space (1959, TV Movie) - Jim Benedict
The Rebel (1960, TV Series) - Confederate Colonel Charles Morris
Wanted Dead or Alive - Season 2, Episode 17 "Mental Lapse"
Laramie (1960, TV Series) - Mace Stringer
Johnny Ringo (1960, TV Series) - Judge Mark Bentley
One Step Beyond - Volume #4 (1959-1960, TV Series) - Gerald Simms / Dr. Alexander Slawson
The DuPont Show with June Allyson (1959-1960, TV Series) - Rudolph Miller / Falk
Stagecoach West (1960, TV Series) - Toby Reese
The Islanders (1961, TV Series) - Hans Lubeck
Sanctuary (1961) - Ira Bobbitt
The Great Impostor (1961) - Ben Stone (uncredited)
The Law and Mr. Jones (1961, TV Series) - Fowler / Jim Chambers
The Twilight Zone (1960-1961, TV Series) - Henry Ritchie / Arch Hammer
Thriller (1960-1961, TV Series) - Mario Asparos / Radan Asparos / Sebastian Grimm
The Investigators (1961, TV Series) - Charles Victor, episode "In a Mirror, Darkly"
Target: The Corruptors! (1961, TV Series) - Joe Knight
Ripcord (1961, TV Series) - Dr. Gustave Merrill
The Outlaws (1960–1962, TV Series) - George Wagner / Jerry Rome / Thomas Bigelow
The Tall Man  (1962, TV Series) - Henry Stewart
The Eleventh Hour (1963, TV Series) - Harvey Lauderback
The Dakotas (1963, TV Series) - George Deus
The Littlest Hobo (1963, TV Series) - Herman Eckels - Bank Teller
The Outer Limits (1963, TV Series, episode: "O.B.I.T.") - Dr. Clifford Scott
Rawhide (1959–1964, TV Series) - Brock Dillman / Capt. Jesse Coulter / Lewis Lewis / Amos Stauffer
Kentucky Jones (1965, TV Series, episode: "The Big Shot") - Charles Caldwell
Mr. Novak (1964-1965, TV Series) - Walter MacTell / Frank Dever
Perry Mason (1958–1966, TV Series) - Erwin Brandt / Col. Owens / Newton Bain / A.D.A. Grosvenor Cutter / Robert Fleetwood
Dr. Kildare (1965–1966, TV Series) - Gerald Prince / Jake McCoy
The Fugitive (1963-1966, TV Series) - Joshua Simmons / Deputy Russ Atkins / Ballinger / Art Mallet / Sgt. Burden
The Monroes (1966, TV Series) - Joe Smith
The Wild Wild West (1965–1967, TV Series) - Dr. Raven / Penrose
Disneyland (1967, TV Series) - Mr. Barlow
Star Trek (1967, TV Series, episode: "The Return of the Archons") - Reger
Fitzwilly (1967) - Mr. Nowell
In Enemy Country (1968) - General Marchois
The Mod Squad (1968, TV Series) - Jason
Strategy of Terror (1969) - Richard
Heaven with a Gun (1969) - Gus Sampson
Bonanza (1960-1969, TV Series) - Seth Nagel / Judge David Terry / Tom Edwards
The Hawaiians (1970) - Houghton
Gunsmoke (1956–1971, TV Series) - Hale Parker / Malachi Harper / Abihu Howell / Tobe Hostater / Pezzy / Ivy / Bill Lee
Mannix (1970-1972, TV Series) - Wilkerson / Martin Kimbrough
Kung Fu (1973, TV Series, playing the same type role he played in the 1969 Bonanza episode, that of an American Civil War Rebel soldier, who, after the war, is still filled with hurt and resentment about the loss to the North) - Amos Buchanan
Emergency! (1973, TV Series) - Barney Olsen
Santee (1973) - Sheriff Carter
Planet of the Apes (1974, TV Series) - Dr. Malthus
Sara (1976, TV Series) - Doc Vaughn
Ark II (1976, TV Series, a story and role very similar to those of his Star Trek appearance) - Marcus
Buck Rogers in the 25th Century (1981, TV Series) - The Guardian
The Incredible Hulk (1981, TV Series) - Dell Frye
Falcon Crest (1981–82, TV Series) - Jason Gioberti
Angel of H.E.A.T. (1983) - Peter Shockley
Voyagers! (1983, TV Series) - Prof. Garth
The Warrior and the Sorceress (1984) - Bludge the Prelate
Magnum, P.I. (1984, TV Series) - Albert Leonard
The Check Is in the Mail... (1986) - Fred Steinkrause

References

External links 

Obituary in The New York Times

1914 births
2001 deaths
20th-century American male actors
20th-century American Episcopal priests
Actors from Huntsville, Alabama
American male film actors
American male stage actors
American male television actors
Burials in Alabama
Columbia University School of the Arts alumni
Male actors from Los Angeles
University of Alabama alumni